The Lukang Kinmen Hall is a historical hall in Lukang Township, Changhua County, Taiwan.

History
The hall was originally built in 1805 as a temple to enshrine Sufu Wangye by the son of Xu Le-shan. The hall was originally called the Wu Jiang Guan. Xu also contributed the tablet Wu Jiang Guan which is hung on the main hall of the building. The hall also functioned as gathering venue for people and navy. In 1848, an earthquake in Changhua damaged the building. The building was then restored in 1855 with funds and labor help from the navy. Once finished, an engraved stone tablet was put on the wall of sacrificial hall.

During the Japanese rule of Taiwan, the hall was partially renovated in 1908. After the restoration, reparation works were done to the main hall and Sanchuan hall in 1975. In June 1994, Changhua County Government carried out historic site restoration work. On 25 October 2000, the Kinmen Hall was declared a county-level historic site.

Transportation
The temple is accessible west of Changhua Station of Taiwan Railways.

See also
 Wang Ye worship
 Lukang Tianhou Temple
 Lukang Wen Wu Temple
 List of tourist attractions in Taiwan

References

1805 establishments in Taiwan
Buildings and structures in Changhua County
Taoist temples in Taiwan